The Atomic Submarine is a 1959 independently made, American black-and-white science-fiction film directed by Spencer Gordon Bennet and starring Arthur Franz, Dick Foran, Brett Halsey, Joi Lansing and Jean Moorhead, with John Hilliard as the voice of the alien. The film was produced by Alex Gordon and distributed by Allied Artists Pictures Corporation.

The storyline of The Atomic Submarine concerns an alien invasion that begins when an underwater UFO (or USO – Unidentified Submerged Object) attacks the world's shipping for unknown reasons. The film showcases the then-new technology of nuclear submarines, and follows the crew and scientists aboard the atomic-powered USS Tigershark, which has been ordered to hunt down the mysterious underwater saucer and stop its disruption of sea commerce.

Plot

A submarine is destroyed near the North Pole by a mysterious undersea light. The loss of this and several other ships in the Arctic alarms the world. Governments temporarily close the polar route and convene an emergency meeting at the Pentagon. Present is Commander Dan Wendover (Dick Foran), the captain of the atomic submarine Tigershark, and Nobel Prize-winning scientist Sir Ian Hunt (Tom Conway). The United States Secretary of Defense (Jack Mulhall) leads the meeting; he explains all that is known about the Arctic disasters, and then describes the high-tech capabilities of Tigershark. These include a special hull and a minisub (Lungfish) that can be stored inside the submarine. The secretary finishes by telling Wendover that he is to take Hunt, Tigershark, and her crew to resolve the ship sinkings, and if possible, eliminate their cause.

Lieutenant Commander Richard "Reef" Holloway (Arthur Franz), Tigersharks executive officer, learns that his bunkmate is to be Dr. Carl Neilson Jr. (Brett Halsey), a pacifistic scientist whom he dislikes. A montage then follows, spotlighting the day-to-day life aboard Tigershark, which eventually discovers the cause of the disasters, an underwater saucer-shaped craft with a sole light atop its upper dome. One of Tigersharks scientists, Dr. Clifford Kent (Victor Varconi), briefly shows a photo of an unidentified flying object, pointing out its similarity to this underwater UFO. The submariners begin to realize that their quarry is extraterrestrial. The crew nicknames the saucer "Cyclops" because of its single light.

Commander Wendover orders the submarine's most powerful torpedoes fired. They reach the saucer, but do not explode, being stopped by a gel-like extrusion coming from within the UFO. The captain orders Tigershark to ram the alien saucer. The submarine's bow tip breaks through its lower side and becomes trapped.

Dr. Neilson pilots Lungfish, taking Lt. Commander Holloway and a small party to board the UFO. Holloway has the boarding party cut free the bow with blow torches. Meanwhile, he explores the saucer's dark hallways after receiving telepathic messages from its sole occupant, an octopus-like creature with a single, very large eye. The alien kills all the boarding party except Holloway. The creature explains that, unlike humanity, what they create is made of living tissue. The saucer is a living creature and (as Holloway understands) is healing. The creature announces that it plans on bringing Holloway and several other specimens back to its home planet for further study. The aliens plan to modify themselves, based on what they learn about the human specimens. Once finished, they will return to colonize Earth.

Holloway attacks by firing a Very pistol into the alien's single eye, temporarily blinding it. While the eye rapidly heals, Holloway races back to Lungfish and returns to the Tigershark. When Dr. Neilson asks about the remainder of their boarding party, Holloway says, "Fortunes of war".

The now-healed saucer sails to the North Pole to recharge its energy in preparation for leaving. Holloway tells Wendover, "Captain, if that thing ever gets back to where it came from, the Earth and everyone on it is doomed".

The submariners hold an emergency meeting of Tigersharks on-board scientists, and they develop a plan to adapt a torpedo's guidance system to convert it into a guided water-to-air missile. When the saucer rises from the ocean, Tigershark fires the missile, destroying the UFO. Holloway and the young Neilson are reconciled, with the latter realizing that his pacifism was no match for a hostile alien.

Cast
 Arthur Franz as Lieutenant Commander Richard 'Reef' Holloway
 Dick Foran as Commander Dan Wendover
 Brett Halsey as Dr. Carl Neilson
 Paul Dubov as Lieutenant David Milburn
 Bob Steele as CPO 'Grif' Griffin
 Victor Varconi as Dr. Clifford Kent
 Joi Lansing as Julie
 Selmer Jackson as Admiral Terhune
 Jack Mulhall as Secretary of Defense Justin Murdock
 Jean Moorhead as Helen Milburn
 Richard Tyler as Seaman Don Carney
 Sid Melton as Yeoman Chester Tuttle
 Kenneth Becker as Seaman Al Powell
 Frank Watkins as Watkins
 Tom Conway as Sir Ian Hunt
 John Hilliard as Voice of Spaceman
 Pat Michaels as Narrator

Production
Principal photography for The Atomic Submarine took place from mid-June to early July 1959. Stock footage of submarines and ship explosions were interspersed with other shots.

Reception
Film historian Paul Meehan considered The Atomic Submarine as "something of a departure from the usual saucer movie formula". Reviewer David Blakeslee,  in a later assessment,  commented that "once you get past the wooden acting, creaky scripts, stilted narration, corny humor, low-budget props, and sheer implausibility of The Atomic Submarines story line, you'll find themes and ideas worth pondering a bit longer than it takes to laugh away at the non-stop unraveling of sci-fi B-movie conventions". Chief among the unusual elements is "a headier-than-expected socio-political debate between a young principled pacifist and the career military man and WWII veteran sub captain over the merits of war and peace".

Related films
Two later science fiction films also "starred" nuclear submarines: the USOS Seaview in Irwin Allen's Voyage to the Bottom of the Sea (1961) and the submarine Atragon in the Japanese film Atragon (1963). In all three, a high-tech nuclear submarine of the near-future travels to the deepest part of the ocean to save the Earth from destruction.

Actor Arthur Franz, who played  Holloway in The Atomic Submarine, guest-starred five years later on an episode of Irwin Allen's 1964 submarine TV series Voyage to the Bottom of the Sea.

Availability
The film was released by the Criterion Collection as part of their "Monsters and Madmen" DVD set on January 23, 2007.

See also
 List of films in the public domain in the United States

References

Further reading

 Meehan, Paul. Saucer Movies: A UFOlogical History of the Cinema. Lanham, Maryland: The Scarecrow Press, 1998. .
 Warren, Bill. Keep Watching the Skies: American Science Fiction Films of the Fifties, 21st Century Edition. Jefferson, North Carolina: McFarland & Company, 2009, (First Edition 1982). .
 Wingrove, David. Science Fiction Film Source Book. London: Longman Group Limited, 1985. .

External links
 
 
 
The Atomic Submarine: Saving the World on a Shoestring Budget an essay by Bruce Eder at the Criterion Collection
 The Atomic Submarine screenplay
 

1959 films
1950s science fiction films
American black-and-white films
American independent films
1950s English-language films
Films set in the Arctic
Science fiction submarine films
American science fiction films
1959 independent films
Films directed by Spencer Gordon Bennet
1950s American films